The Mormon gold coinage consisted of privately-issued tokens which the Church of Jesus Christ of Latter-day Saints struck from 1848 to 1860. They were issued in $2.50, $5, $10, and $20 denominations.

The first coins were minted in 1848 in Salt Lake City, with gold found at Mormon Island, California. About 4000 coins were made before Utah Territory governor Alfred Cumming ordered production to cease in 1861.

Some coins had an inscription in the Deseret alphabet: 𐐐𐐄𐐢𐐆𐐤𐐝 𐐓𐐅 𐐜 𐐢𐐃𐐡𐐔 ("Holiness to the Lord").

See also
 Territorial gold

References

External links
 

Historical currencies of the United States
Coins
United States gold coins
Utah Territory
Token coins